(born February 28, 1973) is a former member of the Takarazuka Revue, in which she specialized in female roles (Musumeyaku). She is from Tokyo and joined the revue in 1991 and retired in 2006. She is the first and the only musumeyaku of her class to receive top billing.

Troupe membership history
 Star Troupe: 1991–1993
 Snow Troupe: 1993–1998
 Cosmos Troupe: 1998–2006

Facts
Considered the "Mary Pickford of Takarazuka", she gained audiences' attention during her first years in Star Troupe, and three years after her debut, in 1994, became top musumeyaku of Snow troupe. Having performed with five different stars as partners, Maki Ichiro (of the Snow troupe), Fubuki Takane (Snow), Yū Todoroki (Snow), Asato Shizuki (Cosmos) and Yōka Wao (Cosmos)--the latter her partner the longest—over the course of twelve years, Hanafusa enjoyed the longest run as star musumeyaku in the Takarazuka's history.

Also, upon her participation in the 1994 new actor production of Gone with the Wind as Scarlett O'Hara, Hanafusa became the only musumeyaku to have her own billing (top billing usually goes to otokoyaku; so this was an exceptional case).

Along with Hitomi Tsukikage (of Star and Snow troupes) and Rei Dan (Moon and Star), she was one of the few musumeyaku to star in two troupes.

In 1998, she founded Cosmos Troupe with Asato Shizuki, Yōka Wao, Wataru Kozuki and Hikaru Asami with an overseas performance in Hong Kong. She retired in 2006.

In January 2007, she came out of retirement and performed on stage along with Yōka Wao in Wao's concert.  Up until 2011, Hanafusa worked as an official representative for Yōka Wao in Wao's company, Wao Enterprise, which they founded together in February 2007.  During this period, Hanafusa has regularly appeared in most of Wao's concerts or as co-star in stage plays where Wao has starred.  It is unusual for partnering stars who have left Takarazuka to continue to work together so closely.
As of October 2011 however, Hanafusa has resigned from Wao Enterprise after participating in Dracula with Wao.  Although she had participated as a guest star in a couple of performances with other Japanese artists, there was no official announcements as to what Hanafusa's future career direction will be until June 2012.

In June 2012 it was released that Hanafusa had signed with From First Production, a talent promotion agency. Her talent profile is found here.

Notable performances and roles

Takarazuka era

As a star

Legend of the Midnight Sun - Mimiru
Parfum de Paris
Mayerling (New Actor Show)　- Marie Vetsera

As top star for Snow

JFK - Jacqueline Kennedy
Elisabeth - Elisabeth
Glowing Purple Flowers
Natasha's Rainbow - Natasha
On a Clear Day You Can See Forever - Daisy Gamble
Midnight Ghost - Maria

As top star for Cosmos

Excalibur - Rosaline (the first Cosmos Troupe production)
Elisabeth - Elisabeth
Passion: Jose and Carmen - Carmen
Mayerling - Marie Vetsera (First show with Yōka Wao as a star couple)
Nostalgia Over the Sea - Catherine the Great
Rose of Versailles: Fersen and Marie Antoinette - Marie Antoinette
Calaf & Turandot - Turandot
Pierre the Mercenary - Joan of Arc
Lightning in Daytime - Vivianne
Gone with the Wind - Scarlett O'Hara
Phantom - Christine Daaé
Boxman - Dolly
Hotel Stella Maris - Stacy Lancaster
A Kiss to the Flames - Leonora
Never Say Goodbye - Katherine McGregor/Peggy McGregor (her last musical with Takarazuka)

Performance after Takarazuka

Dracula, the Musical - Mina Murray (2011)
The Count of Monte Cristo - Mercédès (2013)
Lady Bess - Lady Bess, Elizabeth I of England (2014-2017)
Mozart! - Nannerl (2014)
Elisabeth - Elisabeth (2015, 2016, 2019)
1789 - Marie Antoinette (2016)
The Secret Garden - Lily Craven (2018)
Marie Antoinette - Marie Antoinette (2018)

Concert

2007 Yoka Wao concert
New Yoka: Rock in' Broadway
Elisabeth Special Gala Concert (2012)

Television drama
 Naotora: The Lady Warlord (2017) - Sana

Elisabeth trivia

Hanafusa was the first star to perform as Elisabeth of Bavaria in the musical Elisabeth and the only one to do so twice: first in a 1996 Snow production and then in a 1998 Cosmos production. Thus she was an Elisabeth who was haunted by two deaths (Maki Ichiro and Asato Shizuki), married to two Franz Josephs (Fubuki Takane and Yōka Wao), assassinated by two Luigi Luchenis (Yū Todoroki and Wataru Kozuki). She crowned four Prince Rudolfs (Tatsuki Kōju, Yōka Wao, Hikaru Asami and Sakiho Juri) because Kōju and Asami changed troupes before the Tokyo performance and were substituted by Wao and Juri.

Most of the actresses playing Franz Josephs, Rudolfs and Luigis became stars later on, except Juri, who was moved to Senka.

Fubuki Takane (Franz Joseph [Snow])--> Snow Troupe
Yū Todoroki (Luigi Lucheni [Snow])--> Snow Troupe
Tatsuki Kōju (Rudolf [Snow])--> Star Troupe
Yōka Wao (Rudolf [Snow] and Franz Joseph [Cosmos])--> Cosmos Troupe
Wataru Kozuki (Luigi Lucheni [Cosmos])--> Star Troupe
Hikaru Asami (Rudolf [Cosmos])--> Snow Troupe

References

1973 births
Japanese actresses
Living people
People from Tokyo
Takarazuka Revue